Samokhino is a rural locality (a selo) in Zhutovskoye Rural Settlement, Oktyabrsky District, Volgograd Oblast, Russia. The population was 219 as of 2010. There are 4 streets.

Geography 
Samokhino is located in steppe, on Yergeni, 30 km southeast of Oktyabrsky (the district's administrative centre) by road. Zhutovo 2-ye is the nearest rural locality.

References 

Rural localities in Oktyabrsky District, Volgograd Oblast